Shopping malls play an important role in the Philippine economy. Major Philippine mall chains include SM Supermalls, which has over 43 shopping malls around the country, and Ayala Malls, which has 14 shopping malls nationwide. Other major mall chains include Robinsons Malls, Walter Mart malls, Gaisano Malls, Ever Gotesco Malls, and Isetann.

Operational mall retailers

Metro Manila

Outside Metro Manila

Defunct mall retailers

Metro Manila

References

See also
List of shopping malls in the Philippines

Retailing in the Philippines
Lists of retailers